Pimelodus joannis is a species of catfish in the family Pimelodidae (the long-whiskered catfishes) endemic to Brazil, where it occurs in the Tocantins river basin. This species reaches  in TL.

References

Pimelodidae
Catfish of South America
Endemic fauna of Brazil
Fish of Brazil
Taxa named by Frank Raynner Vasconcelos Ribeiro
Taxa named by Carlos Alberto Santos de Lucena
Fish described in 2008